"Polabian Slavs" is often used as a general term for the West Slavs of Germany. This article is about the specific tribe called "Polabians".
The Polabians were a constituent Lechitic tribe of  the Obotrites who lived between the Trave and the Elbe. The main settlement of the Polabians was Racisburg (modern Ratzeburg), named after their Prince Ratibor. The Polabians were similar to the Drevani, also known as the Draväno-polaben or Drevanen, in Lüchow-Dannenberg.

In 1139, Henry the Lion granted "Polabia" to Count Henry of Badewide. The tribe was subsequently Germanized and assimilated over the following centuries. The last remnants of the Polabians, including the Polabian language, died out in the 18th century. Cultural remnants of the Polabians of Lower Saxony include numerous villages in the region based on Slavic settlement forms.

See also
List of Medieval Slavic tribes

References 

Obotrites
West Slavic tribes
Wendland